Cyrtinus hispidus is a species of beetle in the family Cerambycidae. It was described by Martins and Galileo in 2009. It is known from Ecuador.

References

Cyrtinini
Beetles described in 2009